Elisabeta Abrudeanu (born 28 June 1926) is a Romanian former artistic gymnast. She competed at the 1952 Summer Olympics.

References

External links

1926 births
Possibly living people
Romanian female artistic gymnasts
Gymnasts at the 1952 Summer Olympics
Olympic gymnasts of Romania